iNews (short for Indonesia News, formerly named SUN TV and Sindo TV) is an Indonesian free-to-air television network founded by Media Nusantara Citra, a subsidiary of Global Mediacom unit of MNC Asia Holding. It broadcasting 24 hours a day and 7 days a week.

History 
iNews (Indonesia News) was launched on 5 March 2008 as SUN TV as a pay television channel. It later 2009, obtained a television license from the government to start broadcasting as a free-to-air channel on terrestrial television in Jakarta, Bogor, Depok, Tangerang and Bekasi. The channel was launched as TV3 in those cities and aired commercials.

In 2011, TV3 stopped carrying SUN TV and was acquired by CTV Banten.

On 26 September 2011, SUN TV changed its name to Sindo TV which was part of the synergy of Sindo Media with Sindo Trijaya FM and SINDOnews.com.

3 years later, precisely on 23 September 2014, the Minister of Communication and Information Republic of Indonesia officially granted a network station permit for Sindo TV and broadcasting once again in Jakarta, Bogor, Depok, Tangerang, and Bekasi with the different transmission. Then on 15 December 2014, Sindo TV was officially launched as national television in the "Luar Biasa! (Extraordinary!)" Soft Launching event.

Sindo TV officially changed the name to iNews TV after the iNewsmaker Awards which was held on 6 April 2015. In addition, the local televisions under this television network lost its identity and also changed its name to "iNews TV" (except Kaltim TV in East Kalimantan which broadcast until 2019 and it was relaunched on the digital terrestrial television frequency and instead affiliated with Ajwa TV in 2022).

On 31 October 2017, the "TV" word was removed, so it changed the name to iNews, coinciding with the launching of the new name for news programmes that aired on RCTI (Seputar iNews), MNCTV (Lintas iNews), and GTV (Buletin iNews) at the Indonesia Awards.

Presenters

Current 
 Abraham Silaban (former tvOne anchor)
 Aiman Witjaksono (former RCTI and Kompas TV anchor) 
 Aldi Hawari (former TVRI & CNN Indonesia anchor)
 Anggy Pasaribu (former NET. & BTV anchor)
 Anisha Dasuki (former Metro TV anchor)

 Aprilia Putri (former MNCTV Biro Jawa Timur anchor)
 Arlista Hadhi
 Ayaa Nufus
 Baby Kristami
 Bayu Pradhana
 Bernadetha Ginting
 Bremana Tenaya
 Davie Pratama
 David Silahooij (former SCTV & Bloomberg TV Indonesia anchor)
 Fanni Imaniar (former tvOne & CNN Indonesia anchor, also a presenter at GTV)
 Fazillah Khairunnisa
 Gede Satria (former Trans TV anchor)
 Mirfa Suri
 Prabu Revolusi (former Trans TV, Metro TV, RTV, CNN Indonesia & RCTI anchor)
 Pramesywara Adisenjaya (former Trans TV & Global TV anchor)
 Qudsiah Firdausi
 Ratu Nabila (former MNCTV, BTV & CNN Indonesia anchor)
 Reinhard Sirait (former TVRI Jakarta, TV Edukasi,  RTV & CNN Indonesia anchor)
 Stefanie Patricia
 Syafaati Suryo
 Hotman Paris Hutapea (Hotman Paris Show)
 Indah Setyani (iSeleb)
 Ina Rosalien (iSeleb)
 Haifa Nafisa (iSeleb)
 Corry Pamela (Silet)
 Dona Arsinta (Silet)
 Widi Dwinanda (Silet)
 Estherlita Corraima (Silet)
 Sandra Olga (Silet)
 Angie Ang (Silet)
 Dhiti Ismawardhani (Silet)
 Dona Amelia (Silet)
 Gus Miftah (Ngobrol Bareng Gus Miftah)
 Arie Untung (Cahaya Hati Indonesia)
 Abey Ghifran (Cahaya Hati Indonesia)
 Yuni Shara (ReYunian)
 Rizky Kinos (Intens Reborn)
 Cut Tari (Intens Reborn)

Former presenters 
 Ivo Nasution (now at Kompas TV)
 Muhammad Syahreza (now at Kompas TV)
 Ruby Matondang (now at Nusantara TV)
 Poppy Zeidra (now at BTV)
 Rio Pambudi
 Yulfitri Nesha
 Ariyo Ardi (now an editor-in-chief of GTV and MNC News)
 Loviana Dian (now at Polri TV)
 Arya Sinulingga
 Tommy Tjokro (now at BuddyKu)
 Pratiwi Kusuma (now at Indosiar)
 Haryanto Saputra
 Zacky Hussein (now at RTV)
 David Silahooij (now at MNC News)
 Inne Sudjono (now at BMKG)
 Risca Indah (now at MNC News)
 Debora Pungus
 Yudi Yudawan (now at CNN Indonesia)
 Latief Siregar (now an editor-in-chief of MNCTV)
 Ira Koesno
 Zivanna Letisha
 Tina Talisa
 Wilson Purba
 Anita Mae (now at TVRI)

Identity

Logos

Slogans 
As SUN TV
 Because Every City is Different (2008-2011)
 TV Kebanggaan Milik Anda (2010-2011)

As Sindo TV
 Referensi Indonesia (2011-2014)
 Luar Biasa! (2014-2015)

As iNews
 Inspiring & Informative (2015–present)

See also 
 RCTI
 GTV
 MNCTV
 MNC Trijaya FM
 Koran Sindo
 List of television stations in Indonesia

References

External links 
 

Television channels and stations established in 2008
Mass media in Jakarta
24-hour television news channels in Indonesia
Television networks in Indonesia
Media Nusantara Citra